Bothropoma isseli is a species of sea snail, a marine gastropod mollusk in the family Colloniidae.

Description
The size of the shell reaches 2.5 mm.

Distribution
This species occurs in the Red Sea.

References

External links
 

Colloniidae
Gastropods described in 1929